The red lark (Calendulauda burra), also known as the ferruginous lark or ferruginous sand-lark, is a species of lark in the family Alaudidae. It is found in western South Africa and possibly Namibia. Its natural habitats are subtropical or tropical dry shrubland and subtropical or tropical dry lowland grassland. It is threatened by habitat loss.

Taxonomy and systematics 
Originally, the red lark was classified as belonging to the genus Ammomanes, then later by Mirafra and Certhilauda, until moved to Calendulauda in 2009. Not all authorities recognize each of these re-classifications.

References

External links

 Red lark - Species text in The Atlas of Southern African Birds.

red lark
Birds of Southern Africa
red lark
Taxonomy articles created by Polbot